The yellow-browed seedeater (Crithagra whytii) is a species of finch in the family Fringillidae. It is found in Malawi, Tanzania, and Zambia.

The yellow-browed seedeater was formerly placed in the genus Serinus but phylogenetic analysis using mitochondrial and nuclear DNA sequences found that the genus was polyphyletic. The genus was therefore split and a number of species including the yellow-browed seedeater were moved to the resurrected genus Crithagra.

Since 2012 the IUCN has treated this taxon as a subspecies of Crithagra striolata.

References

Crithagra
Birds described in 1897
Taxa named by George Ernest Shelley
Taxonomy articles created by Polbot
Taxobox binomials not recognized by IUCN